Tooban Junction railway station served Tooban in County Donegal, Ireland.

The station opened on 9 September 1864 when the Londonderry and Lough Swilly Railway built their line from Londonderry Middle Quay to Farland Point.

It closed for passengers on 23 October 1935. Freight services continued until 10 August 1953.

Routes

References

Disused railway stations in County Donegal
Railway stations opened in 1864
Railway stations closed in 1953
1864 establishments in Ireland
1953 disestablishments in Ireland
Railway stations in the Republic of Ireland opened in the 19th century